Leon Thomas in Berlin is a live album by the American jazz vocalist and percussionist Leon Thomas with the saxophonist/arranger Oliver Nelson. The album was recorded in 1970 in Berlin and released by Flying Dutchman.

Reception

The authors of the AllMusic Guide to Jazz awarded the album 5 out of 5 stars.

In a review for Music on the Web (UK), Dick Stafford wrote: "Leon Thomas in Berlin is an excellent example of the work of this almost forgotten vocalist. Thomas was very much a maverick in terms of his singing style, his use of the yodel and other effects turned his voice very much into another frontline musical instrument in much the same manner as scat was used by earlier singers . The lasting impression given by this is of a highly Afro - American form of the idiom which was much in fashion in the late 60's and early 70's. In many ways it is a great pity that this vibrant music has fallen so far from grace to be replaced by the mainstream conservatism that is so omni-present in a great deal of the performances which define Jazz at the present time... The balance of the material is impeccable... The rhythm section on this concert is superb... This is a real gem of a re-release and I feel sure that it will become a favourite of anyone who is prepared to give this highly charged original music a chance."

Track listing
All compositions by Leon Thomas except where noted
 "Straight, No Chaser" (Thelonious Monk, Leon Thomas) − 6:32
 "Pharoah's Tune (The Journey)" (Pharoah Sanders, Thomas) − 9:10
 "Echoes" − 6:00
 "Umbo Weti" − 9:20
 "The Creator Has a Master Plan (Peace)" (Sanders, Thomas) − 8:43
 "Oo-Wee! Hindewe" − 1:07

Personnel
 Leon Thomas – African flute, African mouth organ, vocals, percussion
 Oliver Nelson – alto saxophone
 Arthur Sterling – piano
 Günter Lenz – double bass
 Lex Humphries – drums 
 Sonny Morgan – bongos

References

Leon Thomas live albums
Oliver Nelson live albums
1971 live albums
Flying Dutchman Records live albums